Rodniki is a rural locality (a settlement) in Dyatkovsky District, Bryansk Oblast, Russia. The population was 15 as of 2010. There are 2 streets.

Geography 
Rodniki is located 9 km south of Dyatkovo (the district's administrative centre) by road. Slobodishche is the nearest rural locality.

References 

Rural localities in Dyatkovsky District